PA24 may refer to:
 Pennsylvania Route 24
 Pennsylvania's 24th congressional district
 Pitcairn PA-24, an autogyro of the 1930s
 Piper PA-24 Comanche, a light aircraft first produced in 1957